Dedalus may refer to:

 Dedalus (band), an Italian jazz-rock band
 Dedalus Books, a British publishing company 
 Dedalus Diggle, a Harry Potter character
 Dedalus (medical software company), a provider of healthcare information systems, fined for privacy data breach incident in 2021
 Dedalus Poppy, a single seat ultralight aircraft 
 Dedalus Press, a publisher of contemporary poetry in Ireland
 Dedalus-Preis für Neue Literatur, a German literary prize
 Stephen Dedalus, James Joyce's literary alter ego

See also 

 Daedalus (disambiguation)
 Daedelus (musician), American musician and producer